Alfonso Yuchengco (February 6, 1923 – April 15, 2017) was a Filipino accountant, industrialist, businessman, educator, and diplomat. He headed the Yuchengco Group of Companies, one of the largest family-owned business conglomerates in the Philippines. He also served as chairman of business and educational institutions including the Rizal Commercial Banking Corporation one of the country's largest commercial banks, Mapúa University, and the Malayan School and Colleges located in Makati, Paco, Davao and Laguna.

Business interests
Yuchengco was the Chairman of the Yuchengco Group of Companies, and concurrently the Chairman of the Board of MICO Equities, Inc. (holding company of the Malayan Group of Insurance Companies); Pan Malayan Management and Investment Corporation; Mapúa Institute of Technology; Nippon Life Insurance Company; and the Rizal Commercial Banking Corporation.

He had been the Chairman of the Board of Directors of GPL Holdings; House of Investments, Inc.; BA Savings Bank; Dole Philippines; Philippine Long Distance Telephone Company; Benguet Corporation; and the Philippine Fuji Xerox Corporation.

Education
Yuchengco held a Bachelor of Science in Commerce, major in Accountancy, from the Far Eastern University. He took and passed the licensure examinations for certified public accountants.

Academe
Yuchengco was the Chairman of the Board of Trustees of the Mapúa University, a top-performing engineering school in the country. He was also the Chairman of the Malayan Colleges Laguna, and Malayan High School of Science, an innovative science high school.

He had been a member of the Board of Advisors of the Columbia Business School, one of the leading business schools in the world.

Diplomacy
Yuchengco had been the Philippine Permanent Representative to the United Nations, with the rank of Ambassador Extraordinary and Plenipotentiary (A.E.P.).

He had also served as Presidential Adviser on Foreign Affairs in 2004; Presidential Assistant on APEC Matters in 1998; Philippine Ambassador to Japan in 1995; Philippine Ambassador to the People's Republic of China from 1986 to 1988; and Presidential Special Envoy to Greater China, Japan and Korea.

In 2005, President Gloria Macapagal Arroyo appointed Yuchengco to the Consultative Commission for Charter Change, a special body tasked to review and recommend changes to the 1987 Constitution.

Other interests
Yuchengco was the Chairman of the Board of Bantayog ng mga Bayani Foundation. He was also the Chair Emeritus and Member of the Board of Governors of the Philippine Ambassadors Foundation; and Chair Emeritus and Past President of the Philippine Ambassadors Association.

He was a member of the Board of Judges and a Principal Sponsor in the Mother Teresa Awards.

He established a generous grant at the University of San Francisco to create the Maria Elena G. Yuchengco Philippine Studies Program.

Awards

Yuchengco has received the following awards and citations:
Order of the Sacred Treasure, Gold and Silver Star, from the Emperor of Japan, 2003.
Grand Cordon of the Order of the Rising Sun, from the Emperor of Japan
Order of Sikatuna, Rank of Datu, from then President Fidel Valdez Ramos
Knight Grand Officer of Rizal, Knights of Rizal.
Order of Lakandula, Rank of Bayani (Grand Cross).
Most Distinguished Alumnus and Hall of Fame Awardee, Far Eastern University, 1955 and 2003.

References

External links

Yuchengco Group of Companies
Rizal Commercial Banking Corporation
Mapúa University
Far Eastern University

1923 births
2017 deaths
Mapúa University
Burials at the Manila Memorial Park – Sucat
Far Eastern University alumni
Filipino bankers
Filipino billionaires
20th-century Filipino businesspeople
Filipino diplomats
Filipino educators
Filipino politicians of Chinese descent
Grand Cordons of the Order of the Rising Sun
Grand Crosses of the Order of Lakandula
Individuals honored at the Bantayog ng mga Bayani
Nippon Life
Permanent Representatives of the Philippines to the United Nations
Recipients of the Order of the Sacred Treasure
Recipients of the Presidential Medal of Merit (Philippines)
21st-century Filipino businesspeople